Grey-throated bulbul may refer to several passerine bird species of the bulbul family, Pycnonotidae:

 Palawan bulbul (Alophoixus frater), found in the Philippines
 Western greenbul (Arizelocichla tephrolaema), found in Africa

Birds by common name